Legio IV Flavia Felix ("Lucky Flavian Fourth Legion"), was a legion of the Imperial Roman army founded in AD 70 by the emperor Vespasian (r. 69–79) from the cadre of the disbanded Legio IV Macedonica. The legion was active in Moesia Superior in the first half of the 5th century. The legion symbol was a lion.

History 
During the Batavian rebellion, the IV Macedonica fought for Vespasian, but the emperor distrusted his men, probably because they had supported Vitellius two years before. Therefore IV Macedonica was disbanded, and a new Fourth legion, called Flavian Felix was levied by the emperor, who gave the legio his nomen, Flavia. Since the symbol of the legion is a lion, it was probably levied in July/August 70.

IV Flavia Felix was camped in Burnum, Dalmatia (modern Kistanje), where it replaced XI Claudia. After the Dacian invasion of 86, Domitian moved the legion to Moesia Superior, in Singidunum (modern Belgrade, Serbia), although there is some evidence of the presence of this legion, of one of its vexillationes in Viminacium (near modern-day Kostolac, Serbia), base of VII Claudia. 

In 89 the Fourth participated to the retaliation invasion of Dacia (see Domitian's Dacian War). It also participated in the Dacian Wars of Trajan, being victorious at the Second Battle of Tapae. The legion also participated at the final and decisive battle against the Dacians, conquering their capital, Sarmisegetusa.

Monuments of IV Flavia Felix have been found at Aquincum (Budapest). This suggests that a subunit replaced II Adiutrix during its absence during the wars of Lucius Verus against the Parthian empire (162-166). 

In the Marcomannic Wars (166–180), the fourth fought on the Danube against the Germanic tribes.

After the death of Pertinax, the IV Flavia Felix supported Septimius Severus against usurpers Pescennius Niger and Clodius Albinus.

The legion may have fought in one of the several wars against the Sassanids, but stayed in Moesia Superior until the first half of the 5th century.

Attested members

In popular culture 
This Roman Legion was featured in the beginning of the movie Gladiator where Maximus Decimus Meridius was the Legion general, leading the campaign in Germania against the Marcomanni.

See also
List of Roman legions
Roman legion
Legio IIII Macedonica

References

External links
livius.org account of Legio IIII Flavia Felix
Reenactment Legion based in Southern Ontario, Canada portraying IIII Flavia Felix

04 Flavia Felix
5th-century disestablishments in the Roman Empire
Military units and formations established in the 1st century
70s establishments in the Roman Empire
70s establishments
70 establishments